Tianjin CTF Finance Center is a super-tall skyscraper located in the TEDA CBD of Binhai, Tianjin, China. Construction started in 2013 and was completed in 2019. The tower is the second tallest building in Municipal Tianjin after Goldin Finance 117, eighth tallest building in the world, and the tallest building in the world with fewer than 100 floors. It is located in the outer district of the Tianjin Economic-Technological Development Area. Tianjin CTF Finance Center is designed by Skidmore, Owings & Merrill LLP in collaboration with Ronald Lu & Partners. 

The building was honored with the Tall/Slender Structure award at the 2021 Awards Ceremony by the Institution of Structural Engineers (IStructE).

Design

The building commonly designed as the softly curving glass skin integrates eight sloping mega-columns that follow a lyrical line connecting the centers and corners of all four elevations. These curving mega-columns increase the structure's response to seismic concerns and are integral to both the gravity and lateral systems. They are effective in increasing the stiffness of the building's perimeter frame, consequently attracting a larger portion of the seismic forces in compliance with the Chinese code requirements.

The façade reinforces the curvature of the tower form and creates a shimmering texture over the building's surface. The crystalline-like curtain wall stretches from the suspended glass canopies at each of the lobbies to the dematerialized, mega-column-looped crown and presents a bold expression of a comprehensive, integrated design on the Tianjin skyline.

Features

By stacking reducing floor plates, the tower tapers dramatically to minimize the surface area exposed to wind, sun, and moisture. The gently-undulating curves of the facade subtly denote the integration of the three distinct programs within a singular smooth object. Square in plan with rounded corners, the floor plate geometry enables unique interior fit-outs and customization options for occupants. Research by the architect has shown that lateral forces due to vortex shedding can be controlled by tapering the vertical profile of the tower and softening any sharp corners in plan. The building's aerodynamic shape greatly reduces this vortex shedding by “confusing the wind” and disrupting the opportunity for any resonating wind forces and loads on the structure.

Construction process 
On November 20, 2009, Tianjin Chow Tai Fook Financial Center held a groundbreaking ceremony. The then Tianjin Mayor Huang Xingguo attended the ceremony.
The Tianjin CTF Finance Centre was proposed as an idea in 2011.
As of April 2016, one third of the entire building has been built.
In July 2016, the core tube of the building was poured to 260 meters.
In September 2016, the building was built as a transition truss between the office building and the serviced residential part.
In April 2017, CTBUH confirmed that the building has been structurally topped.
In May 2017, the steel structure on the top of this building began to be installed.
On October 31, 2017, the steel structure crown was sealed.
The building was completed in September 2019.

Building shape 
Tianjin Chow Tai Fook Financial Center (old plan) is a polyline-shaped building with a square shape as the base, and the shape is tapered from bottom to top. In the design effect, in the daytime, the building will refract the sunlight to show various colors, and at night, the top of the inclined tower glows like a diamond. The new plan is rocket-shaped and dominated by arcs; the crown is like a cicada's wings.

See also

Goldin Finance 117
Sino-Steel International Plaza
Jin Wan Plaza 1
Rose Rock International Finance Center

References

Skyscraper office buildings in Tianjin
Residential skyscrapers in China
Skyscraper hotels in Tianjin
Skyscrapers in Tianjin
2019 establishments in China
Office buildings completed in 2019
Hotel buildings completed in 2019